Giannis Chatzinikolaou (born 30 January 1965) is a Greek retired football defender and later manager. He was a squad member for the 1988 UEFA European Under-21 Championship.

References

1965 births
Living people
Greek footballers
Aris Thessaloniki F.C. players
Ionikos F.C. players
Greece under-21 international footballers
Greek football managers
OFI Crete F.C. managers
Ionikos F.C. managers
Egaleo F.C. managers
Platanias F.C. managers
Iraklis Thessaloniki F.C. managers
Aris Thessaloniki F.C. managers
Panthrakikos F.C. managers
Ergotelis F.C. managers
Association football defenders
Footballers from Serres